In mathematics, even and odd ordinals extend the concept of parity from the natural numbers to the ordinal numbers. They are useful in some transfinite induction proofs.

The literature contains a few equivalent definitions of the parity of an ordinal α:

Every limit ordinal (including 0) is even. The successor of an even ordinal is odd, and vice versa.
Let α = λ + n, where λ is a limit ordinal and n is a natural number. The parity of α is the parity of n.
Let n be the finite term of the Cantor normal form of α. The parity of α is the parity of n.
Let α = ωβ + n, where n is a natural number. The parity of α is the parity of n.
If α = 2β, then α is even. Otherwise α = 2β + 1 and α is odd.

Unlike the case of even integers, one cannot go on to characterize even ordinals as ordinal numbers of the form  Ordinal multiplication is not commutative, so in general  In fact, the even ordinal  cannot be expressed as β + β, and the ordinal number
(ω + 3)2 = (ω + 3) + (ω + 3) = ω + (3 + ω) + 3 = ω + ω + 3 = ω2 + 3
is not even.

A simple application of ordinal parity is the idempotence law for cardinal addition (given the well-ordering theorem). Given an infinite cardinal κ, or generally any limit ordinal κ, κ is order-isomorphic to both its subset of even ordinals and its subset of odd ordinals. Hence one has the cardinal sum

References

Ordinal numbers
Parity (mathematics)